Muzaffarpur Assembly constituency is an assembly constituency in Muzaffarpur district in the Indian state of Bihar. In 2015 Bihar Legislative Assembly election, Muzaffarpur was one of the 36 seats to have VVPAT enabled electronic voting machines.

Extent
As per Delimitation of Parliamentary and Assembly constituencies Order, 2008, No. 94 Muzaffarpur Assembly constituency is composed of the following: Muzaffarpur municipal corporation and Bhagwanpur, Madhubani, Majhauli Khetal and Patahi gram panchayats of Musahari community development block.

Muzaffarpur Assembly constituency is part of No. 15 Muzaffarpur (Lok Sabha constituency).

Members of Legislative Assembly

Election Results

2020

References

External links
 

Assembly constituencies of Bihar
Politics of Muzaffarpur district
Muzaffarpur